Viranialur (aloor) railway station (Station code: VRLR) is found to be between Thiruvananthapuram–Kanyakumari railway route. The station has one platforms and falls on the Kanyakumari–Thiruvananthapuram line in the Thiruvananthapuram  division of the Southern Railway zone. All passenger trains passing through the station halts in Viranialur station.

Suburban stations

References

External links
 India Rail Info

Thiruvananthapuram railway division
Railway stations in Kanyakumari district
Railway stations opened in 1979